The 1961–62 Kansas Jayhawks men's basketball team represented the University of Kansas during the 1961–62 college men's basketball season.

Roster
Jerry Gardner
Nolen Ellison
Jim Dumas 
Harry Gibson
Loye Sparks
John Matt
Robert Buddy Vance
Lee Flachsbarth
Jay Roberts
Carl Deane
Derrill Gwinner
Pete Townsend

Schedule

References

Kansas Jayhawks men's basketball seasons
Kansas
Kansas
Kansas